Kateřina Nash (née Hanušová; born 9 December 1977) is a Czech cross-country skier and cyclist who competed from 1994 to 2003 in skiing and is still active in cycling for the Clif Pro Team. Competing in two Winter Olympics, she finished sixth in the 4 × 5 km relay at Nagano in 1998 and had her best individual finish of 20th in the 15 km event in Salt Lake City in 2002.

Career
Nash was born in Prachatice.

Cross-country skiing
Nash's best finish at the FIS Nordic World Ski Championships was 19th in the 5 km + 10 km combined pursuit at Ramsau in 1999. Her best World cup finish was 18th in a 5 km + 5 km combined pursuit in the United States in 2001.

Nash earned four individual career victories up to 10 km in FIS races from 1997 to 2001.

Bicycle racing
In January 2010 she won an UCI Cyclo-cross World Cup race in Roubaix and also finished 4th in 2010 UCI Cyclo-cross World Championships and 3rd in 2011 UCI Cyclo-cross World Championships.

She competed at the 2012 Summer Olympics, finishing in 14th place in the women's cross-country mountain bike event.

On 16 September 2015 she won the CrossVegas Cyclocross World Cup race in Las Vegas, Nevada, which was the first-ever UCI Cyclo-cross World Cup race to be run outside Europe. Following her World Cup victory, she won The Night Weasels Cometh in Shrewsbury, Massachusetts on 30 September 2015.

Cross-country skiing results
All results are sourced from the International Ski Federation (FIS).

Olympic Games

World Championships

World Cup

Season standings

Team podiums

 1 victory – (1 ) 
 1 podium – (1 )

Cycling results

Cyclo-cross

2008–2009
 3rd  UEC European Championships
 UCI World Cup
3rd Pijnacker
2009–2010
 1st  National Championships
 UCI World Cup
1st Roubaix
2010–2011
 1st  National Championships
 3rd  UCI World Championships
 UCI World Cup
3rd Aigle
3rd Plzeň
3rd Kalmthout
2011–2012
 UCI World Cup
1st Tábor
3rd Plzeň
3rd Hoogerheide
2012–2013
 Bpost Bank Trophy
1st Baal
3rd Loenhout
 Superprestige
1st Diegem
 UCI World Cup
2nd Namur
3rd Fiuggi
2014–2015
 1st  National Championships
 UCI World Cup
1st Namur
2nd Heusden-Zolder
2nd Hoogerheide
 Bpost Bank Trophy
1st Loenhout
1st Baal
 Superprestige
3rd Diegem
2015–2016
 UCI World Cup
1st Waterloo
2016–2017
 3rd Overall UCI World Cup
1st Namur
2nd Las Vegas
2nd Fiuggi
3rd Heusden-Zolder
 Toi Toi Cup
1st Unicov
 3rd  UCI World Championships
 Superprestige
3rd Diegem
 DVV Trophy
3rd Antwerpen
2017–2018
 UCI World Cup
1st Iowa City
2018–2019
 2nd Zonnebeke
 Toi Toi Cup
2nd Kolin
 UCI World Cup
3rd Waterloo
2019–2020
 3rd Overall UCI World Cup
1st Waterloo
2nd Iowa City
 Toi Toi Cup
1st Jabkenice
1st Unicov

References

External links
 
 
 
 
 Women's 4 × 5 km cross-country relay Olympic results: 1976–2002 
 Katerina Nash cyclocross photo ebook

1977 births
Living people
People from Prachatice
Czech female cross-country skiers
Czech female cyclists
Cyclo-cross cyclists
Czech mountain bikers
Cross-country skiers at the 1998 Winter Olympics
Cross-country skiers at the 2002 Winter Olympics
Cyclists at the 1996 Summer Olympics
Cyclists at the 2012 Summer Olympics
Cyclists at the 2016 Summer Olympics
Olympic cross-country skiers of the Czech Republic
Olympic cyclists of the Czech Republic
Sportspeople from the South Bohemian Region